Martti Johannes Kosma (26 March 1922 – 29 July 1999) was a Finnish footballer and manager.

Playing career
Kosma began his career at KuPS. In 1953, Kosma moved to Kajaanin Palloilijat, playing for the club for a year, before returning to KuPS.

Managerial career
Following his playing career, Kosma moved into management. In 1958, Kosma managed KuPS to the 1958 Mestaruussarja title. Kosma moved to Reipas Lahti, winning the Mestaruussarja in 1963, 1967 and 1970, as well as the Finnish Cup in 1964. In 1975, Kosma managed the Finland national team for two games.

References

People from Sortavala
1922 births
1999 deaths
Finnish footballers
Finland national football team managers
Finnish football managers
Kuopion Palloseura players
Kuopion Palloseura managers
Mestaruussarja players
Mestaruussarja managers
Association footballers not categorized by position
20th-century Finnish people